David Marrero and Daniel Muñoz de la Nava were the defending champions, but they chose not to participate that year.
Pere Riba and Pablo Santos won the final against Simone Vagnozzi and Uros Vico 6–3, 6–2.

Seeds

Draw

Draw

References
Main Draw

2009 ATP Challenger Tour
2009,Doubles